The La Jolla Fashion Film Festival (LJFF) is an annual three-day film festival and host of the International Fashion Film Awards held in La Jolla, California. LJFF is the first international Fashion Film Festival of its kind to be founded in North America. This elite fashion industry event screens some of the top fashion films produced worldwide. The festival features panel discussions, seminars, after parties, and an award ceremony.

References

External links 

Official La Jolla Fashion Film Festival website
LJFFF on Facebook

Film festivals in California
Fashion Film Festival
Culture of San Diego
Cinema of Southern California
Fashion events in the United States
Fashion festivals
 Film festivals in San Diego
Tourist attractions in San Diego County, California